Akira is a 2016 Indian Hindi-language action crime thriller film co-written, produced and directed by A. R. Murugadoss. It is a remake of the 2011 Tamil-language film Mouna Guru, and features Sonakshi Sinha, Konkana Sen Sharma and Anurag Kashyap in the lead roles.

Principal photography began in March 2015, and the film released worldwide on 2 September 2016. The soundtrack composed by Vishal–Shekhar, was released on 16 August 2016. The film received mixed reviews from critics with praise for the performances of the cast but criticism for writing of the film.

Plot 
Akira Sharma, a young girl, witnesses a group of men throwing acid on a woman's face. She helps the police catch one of the criminals. and is therefore harassed by the accused who slash her face out of revenge, giving her a scar. Subsequently, her father enrolls her in a self-defense class. A couple of days later, she comes across the same men who had escaped earlier and tries to catch them. One of them tries to throw acid on her, but it ends up on his own face in the brawl. Akira is arrested, convicted and sent to a remand home for the attack.

3 years later, Akira is released and later grows into a rebellious tough woman. When she starts going to college, her brother comes to pick her mother and her. And hence she moves from Jodhpur to Mumbai. She joins a college and begins living in a hostel, where she finds it difficult to adjust to normal life. The college is also dealing with a thieving student, as more and more electronics keep getting stolen. When a corrupt and drunk-on-power police officer, ACP Rane hits an elderly college professor with his car and then beats him up, the college students take out a massive protest. The protests turn violent, however Akira patiently waits to hand over their petition to the Commissioner.

A couple of days later, Rane goes to help a car crash victim but robs and kills him, when he finds loot in his trunk. His girlfriend, Maya, who is in the same college as Akira, secretly records his conversation about evidence disposal. Her bag with the camera is, however, stolen, and someone starts blackmailing Rane. Suspecting Maya, he brutally kills her. Despite his insistence, the case is handled by SP Rabiya, who suspects Maya's murder.

Meanwhile, the college announces that they will pardon the electronic thief if they return all the stolen items anonymously. Akira finds a bag full of stolen items, including the camera, in front of her dorm. Rane's associates catch her with the camera and decide to kill her and two other witnesses. She, however, escapes when the men reload their gun after killing the other two.

Rane and his men, declare Akira to be mentally unstable. Given her violent past and her rebellious behaviour, her family members as well as her friends are easily convinced. She is taken away to a mental asylum, and, with the help of a corrupt doctor, they give her electric shocks to drive her insane. With the help of another mentally ill patient, she brutally murders the doctors and the guards and escapes. She abducts one of Rane's associates and blackmails him to prove her innocence. Rane, however, traces her hideout and attacks it. Rabiya, with an arrest-warrant for Rane, arrives and seizes all the arms but is stopped by the Commissioner, as the car-crash victim was the brother of a major politician – something which will lead to riots if the news of his murder breaks out. Rane gets back the charge, and the commissioner orders him to take Akira to a mental asylum. Helpless, Rabiya leaves but quietly carries along the seized arms, leaving those inside unarmed. Akira easily kills Rane and his associates in hand-to-hand combat and then goes back to the mental asylum. Completely sane, she is released three months later. In the end, she starts living her late father's life in Jodhpur and is living peacefully there teaching deaf children.

Cast 

 Sonakshi Sinha as Akira Sharma
 Mishiekka Arora as young Akira Sharma
 Konkona Sen Sharma as SP Rabiya Sultan
 Anurag Kashyap as ACP Govind Rane, a  Mumbai Police officer
 Rose J Kaur as Sister Marlyn
 Raai Laxmi as Maya Amin, ACP Rane's girlfriend
 Teena Singh as Nikki, a college bully  
 Phalguni Khanna as an acid attack victim
 Amit Sadh as Dr. Siddharth "Sid" Nerurkar, Shilpa's brother
 Urmila Mahanta as Anna Jain, the college Principal's daughter
 Lokesh Vijay Gupte as Inspector Dinesh Manik, Rane's associate
 Chaitanya Choudhury as Ajay Sharma, Akira's elder brother
 Taher Penwala as young Ajay
 Ashish Dixit as Vishal, Shilpa's brother and Akira's friend 
 Smita Jaykar as Mrs. Sharma, Akira's mother
 Ankita Karan Patel as Shilpa Sharma, Ajay's wife
 Saurabh Goyal as Sunil Vij, Maya's friend
 Nandu Madhav as Inspector Rajeshwar Raai, Rane's associate
Krishna Bhatt as David
 Uday Sabnis as Constable Bapu Raao
 Narsingh Pandey as Akira's college professor
 Arun Verma as Akira's psychiatrist 
 Atul Kulkarni as Mr. Jignesh Sharma, Akira's father (special appearance)
 Kajol Saroj as a patient at the asylum

Music

The songs featured in the film were composed by the duo Vishal–Shekhar. The background score of the film was composed by John Stewart Eduri.

The song Kehkasha Tu Meri is a remake of the duo's Marathi song Harvali Pakhare from the 2012 film Balak-Palak, sung by Shekhar Ravjiani.

Reception

Critical reception
On review aggregator website Rotten Tomatoes, the film holds an approval rating of 33% based on 9 reviews, with an average rating of 5.60/10.

Anupama Chopra giving the film 2.5/5, praised the performances of Sinha, Kashyap and Sharma, but criticised the second half. She wrote that "Anurag [Kashyap] gives Rane just the right touches of menace and sleaze." The second half, however, "strikes so badly in this film that it almost completely negates the first half, which is effective."

Anna M.M. Vetticad, praised the acting but criticised the character development. For Sinha's character, she wrote, "Akira is the most poorly fleshed out character in the entire story...a woman who can fight as skillfully and strongly as any man. That is it. The workings of her mind, her motivations and her feelings, remain a mystery." She, however, praised Kashyap's portrayal of Rane, calling it the "best-written character" whose "drug-addled brain is never so clouded as to make him lose sight of his self-interest."

Writing for Reuters, Shilpa Jamkhandikar praised the acting but criticised the writing calling it a mashup of "many half-baked sub-plots" and very similar in style to cop movies from the 80s. She believes that "[Akira] is a great example of a movie with a timely topic that suffers from outdated treatment." She, however, praised Kahyap's character, Rane, writing "[he] channels every 80s bad cop character we’ve seen. If it wasn’t for him, “Akira” would have been a complete loss as a film."

Box office

India
The film collected  on its opening day in India. By the end of its first weekend, Akira had grossed  and its first week collection was approximately  domestically.

Overseas
Akira collected  from North America (America and Canada),  from UAE,  from UK. The film collected  from Pakistan.

References

External links 
 

2016 films
2010s Hindi-language films
2016 action thriller films
Indian action thriller films
Films scored by Vishal–Shekhar
Films directed by AR Murugadoss
Hindi remakes of Tamil films
Fox Star Studios films
Films about social issues in India
Films about women in India
Hindi-language action films